Sarath Kottikkal is an Indian Filmmaker from Kerala, best known for the Documentary film Sarah Thaha Thoufeek (2022).

Early life and education
Born in Thrissur, Sarath did graduation in Visual Communication and Masters in Journalism & Mass Communication. He has also completed a diploma in 3D Animation from Toonz Animation India, Academy. Sarath has done commercials for clients like Confident Group, Amrut Veni, Sangeetha Mobiles, and Gokulam Kerala FC through his production house OFT Studios Private Limited.

Career
He started his career with Synagogueinte Naatil, a documentary about the Cochin Jews in Mattancherry, Kerala as a part of his academic project. In 2013, Sarath began the shoot of Sarah Thaha Thoufeek in Chendamangalam and continued till 2019. The makers hosted a special screening of Sarah Thaha Thoufeek as a homage to the late Sarah Jacob Cohen, the protagonist of the documentary, in Israel on 1 March 2020.  The event was organised by Embassy of India in Israel & the Museum of the Jewish People at Beit Hatfutsot.

Filmography

References

External links 
 
 
 

1990 births
Living people
Indian documentary filmmakers